Mahagaon is a village in the Gulbarga district of the Indian state of Karnataka. Freedom fighter Chandrasekhar Patil and martyr Apparao Patil are local heroes, having participated in the Indian freedom struggle and the Hyderabad Karnataka Liberation Movement.

History 
Mahagaon's early name was Mahaguna or Maha Gaon, meaning "big village".

During Hyderabad Nizam rule, Mahagaon village was a former administrative taluk of Hyderabad's North Kalaburagi district.

Sangashetty Police Patil built a police section in Mahagaon in 1859. Sangashetty Police Patil built Malisiddeshwara temple, Mallikarajuna, Lord Hununmana temple, and Laxmi temple in Mahagaon village. Sangashetty Police Patil was the administrative head of Mahagaon taluka. He administered and maintained all revenue records and also looked after law and order.

The population, including Jageer’s, was 61,179 in 1901 in an area of 370 square miles. Mahagaon Taluka controlled 104 villages, of which 23 were jagris. Mahagaon was a headquarters for revenue collection in 1901. The land revenue was 1.4 lakhs. In 1905, taluka was merged into the Gulbarga taluka.

In 1947, Kasim Razvi founded the Razakars troops in 52 centers in Hyderabad, including Mahagaon. A Razakars house is located in Mahagaon.

Mahagaon people participated in Hyderabad Karnataka Liberation Movement.

Temples 
The Akka Mahadevi Temple honors Akka Mahadevi, who lived in the 12th century. It is claimed that Akka Mahadevi visited the village.

Caste 
People of various castes and ideologies live harmoniously together in Mahagaon, including Veershewa, Jangama, Poojari, Talawara, and Maraths.

Notables 
Poet Gurulingasidda was born in Mahagaon. She wrote Shree Sharanabasawesara Purana in the Kannada language, a biography of Shree Shran Basaveshwara.

Folksinger Mira Saheba was born in Mahagaon. He wrote many poems in the Kannada language and earned a Folk Academy Award.

Religion 
Viraktamatha, Kallimatha, Gachchina Matha, Jangimatha, Naganath Matha teach religious awareness. Vasanashaba Dargah is near Mahagaon Cross. Hindu and Muslim participation exemplifies local religious harmony.

Movement. Apparao Patil work in Dudhani Border military camps.

Demographics
Mahagaon village has a total population of 8,831, including 4,384 males, 4,347 females and 1,634 families as of the 2011 Population Census.

Education 
 Government higher primary school Mahagaon
 Government high school Mahagaon. Government first grade college Mahagaon.
 Government Industrial training institute, Mahagaon.

Agriculture
Crops produced in Mahagaon include Pigeon peas, Sorghum, Pearl millet, chickpeas, mung beans, and vigna mungos.

References

External links

Villages in Kalaburagi district